"Saved by Love" is a 1988 single by the Christian music singer Amy Grant. It was released as the first single from her Lead Me On album.

Keyboardist Benmont Tench from Tom Petty and the Heartbreakers was the featured Hammond B3 organ player on the song's mid-solo.

"Saved by Love" was a number-one Christian hit and peaked at #32 on the adult contemporary chart.

Personnel 
 Amy Grant – lead and backing vocals 
 Robbie Buchanan – acoustic piano 
 Benmont Tench – Hammond B3 organ
 Gary Chapman – acoustic guitar 
 Dann Huff – guitars 
 Jerry McPherson – guitars 
 Mark O'Connor – mandolin
 Mike Brignardello – bass 
 Paul Leim – drums

Charts

Music sample

Amy Grant songs
1988 singles
Songs written by Amy Grant
1988 songs
A&M Records singles